Syed Mobeen Ahmed is a Pakistani politician who has been a member of the National Assembly of Pakistan since August 2018.

Political career
He was elected to the National Assembly of Pakistan from Constituency NA-175 (Rahim Yar Khan-I) as a candidate of Pakistan Tehreek-e-Insaf in 2018 Pakistani general election.
| image=Emblem of National Assembly of Pakistan.png

External Link

More Reading
 List of members of the 15th National Assembly of Pakistan

References

Living people
Pakistani MNAs 2018–2023
Pakistan Tehreek-e-Insaf politicians
Year of birth missing (living people)